Burkholderia plantarii is a Gram-negative soil bacterium. Its specific name comes from the Latin plantarium (seedbed).

Burkholderia vandii is a synonym of this species, which was named after the orchid Vanda, where it was first found.

References

External links
Type strain of Burkholderia plantarii at BacDive -  the Bacterial Diversity Metadatabase

Burkholderiaceae
Bacteria described in 1994